Michael Bryant Maksudian (born May 28, 1966) is an American former professional baseball catcher. He spent 1992 with the Toronto Blue Jays, 1993 with the Minnesota Twins, and 1994 with the Chicago Cubs of Major League Baseball (MLB). In 41 career at-bats, he collected 9 hits and 6 RBIs. He was famous for consuming insects in the Jays' bullpen during his time as a backup catcher. 

Maksudian attended Parsippany High School and University of South Alabama. In 1987, he played collegiate summer baseball with the Falmouth Commodores of the Cape Cod Baseball League.

References

External links
, or Retrosheet
Pelota Binaria (Venezuelan Winter League)

1966 births
Living people
American expatriate baseball players in Canada
American people of Armenian descent
Baseball players from Illinois
Cardenales de Lara players
American expatriate baseball players in Venezuela
Chicago Cubs players
Edmonton Trappers players
Falmouth Commodores players
Iowa Cubs players
Knoxville Blue Jays players
Major League Baseball catchers
Major League Baseball first basemen
Miami Miracle players
Minnesota Twins players
Morris Titans baseball players
Parsippany High School alumni
People from Parsippany-Troy Hills, New Jersey
Portland Beavers players
South Alabama Jaguars baseball players
South Bend White Sox players
Sportspeople from Belleville, Illinois
Sportspeople from Morris County, New Jersey
St. Lucie Mets players
Syracuse Chiefs players
Tampa White Sox players
Toronto Blue Jays players